Now Estalakh (also Romanized as Now Esţalakh, Novāsţalkh, and Now Asţalakh) is a village in Belesbeneh Rural District, Kuchesfahan District, Rasht County, Gilan Province, Iran. At the 2006 census, its population was 371, in 106 families.
its name mean is "New pool" in English.

References 

Populated places in Rasht County